The Tazlăul Mare oil field is an oil field located in Tazlău, Neamț County. It was discovered in 2010 and developed by Europa Oil & Gas.

References

Oil fields in Romania